Ola Al-Fares (born November 6, 1985) is a Jordanian lawyer, journalist and television presenter who works at Al Jazeera. 
She is currently the second most followed Jordanian woman on Twitter after Queen Rania. Most known for presenting a TV show called MBC in a week by Middle East Broadcasting Center channel. She was also the first Arab woman to climb Burj Khalifa. She won the young TV presenter Arab woman of the year award on December 3, 2015.
Ola  Alfares was selected among the most 500 Influential  Muslims in the world according to  the  Muslims 500 in  2019 edition.

Also, she won the prestigious social media award "Sheikh Mohammed Bin Rashid Award for humanitarian causes". She has used her social media to support many humanitarian initiatives to help the less fortunate people in life.

Biography
Al-Fares was born in Amman, Jordan on November 6, 1985 to a well known political family. 
Her grandfather was Abdul Raouf Al Fares, a member of the Jordanian Parliament from 1954 until  his death in 1984. Her father Tahsin Al-Fares was also a member of the Jordanian Parliament in 1985.

She graduated from high school at the age of 16. She later graduated from law school at Al-Ahliyya Amman University at a young age of 19. She started working as a reporter at the age of 17 and OK! British magazine described her as one of the youngest reporters in the Middle East. In 2004, she started working for Al Arabiya. Afterwards, she worked for MBC from 2007 until 2019. On 31 May 2019, Al-Fares declared that she is moving to Al Jazeera.

Endorsements
Since 2016, she has been working as the brand ambassador for L'Oréal in the Middle East. Al Fares has been working as the brand ambassador for the Jordanian utility company Zain Jordan.

Awards

 Young Arab Media Professionals Award (2009)
 Best Jordanian Media Award (2009)
  Creative Youth Shield (2010)
  Jordanian Model for Successful Youth (2011)
  Arab Woman Of The Year  (2015)

References

People from Amman
Jordanian models
Jordanian socialites
Jordanian journalists
Jordanian lawyers
Jordanian women lawyers
Jordanian women journalists
Living people
1985 births
Al-Ahliyya Amman University alumni